Chelsea is the former name of the northwestern part of The Heights in Jersey City, New Jersey, USA, that is located near Transfer Station. Chelsea was once part of Hudson City and bordered the former town of West Hoboken.

References

Neighborhoods in Jersey City, New Jersey